The YALSA Award for Excellence in Nonfiction, established in 2010, is an annual literary award presented by the Young Adult Library Services Association of the American Library Association that "honors the best nonfiction book published for young adults (ages 12-18)". It was first given in 2010. The award is announced at ALA's Midwinter Meeting.

The judges select nonfiction titles published for young adults that were published the previous year between November 1 and October 31. All print forms that are marked as intended for young adults are eligible for consideration, including graphic formats.  To be eligible, "the title must include excellent writing, research, presentation and readability for young adults." The Excellence in Nonfiction for Young Adults award is one of few that recognizes nonfiction for young adults.

Recipients

Winners and finalists

Nominations

2019

2018

2017

2016

2015

2014

2013

2012

2011

2010

References

American Library Association awards
American non-fiction literary awards
Young adult literature awards
Awards established in 2010
2010 establishments in the United States